The H.S. Mendenhall Observatory  is an astronomical observatory owned and operated by Oklahoma State University.  Named after the university's first astronomer, Harrison Shepler Mendenhall, it is located in Stillwater, Oklahoma, United States.

See also 
List of observatories

References

External links
 Official homepage
 Stillwater Clear Sky Clock Forecast of observing conditions covering Mendenhall Observatory.

Astronomical observatories in Oklahoma
Buildings and structures in Stillwater, Oklahoma
Oklahoma State University